The 2013–14 Bay Area Rosal season was the first season in the Professional Arena Soccer League for the Bay Area Rosal professional indoor soccer club. The Rosal, a Pacific Division team, played their home games at Cabernet Indoor Sports in Livermore, California.

Bay Area Rosal was led by owner Chris Rockenbaugh and head coach Luis Orellana. Mario Astorga was the team's head coach for its first 8 games of the season before leaving the team in late December.

Season summary
Bay Area Rosal began its inaugural campaign with a pre-season match against the Turlock Express on October 26. The Rosal lost 6–7. They lost their first PASL regular season match 7–12 to the Las Vegas Legends and lost again to Turlock before winning 5 of their next 7 matches to close out 2013. 2014, however, started with 4 consecutive losses and the team ultimately finished the season with a 5–11 record.

The Bay Area Rosal are participating in the 2013–14 United States Open Cup for Arena Soccer starting with a Round of 32 victory over Turlock Express and a Round of 16 win over Sacramento Surge to advance to the Quarter-finals against the Las Vegas Legends. They lost 21–0, ending their tournament run.

History
Founded in 1998 as an amateur club, the team (then known as Bladium Rosal) won the 2012–13 Premier Arena Soccer League championship before moving up to the professional league in 2013. The team shares its "Rosal" name with team owner Chris Rockenbaugh's auto recycling business.

Schedule

Pre-season

Regular season

† Game also counts for US Open Cup, as listed in chart below.
♥ Rescheduled from February 16.

U.S. Open Cup for Arena Soccer

References

External links
Bay Area Rosal official website
Bay Area Rosal on Facebook

Bay Area Rosal
Bay Area Rosal
Bay Area Rosal 2013
Bay Area Rosal 2013
Bay Area Rosal 2013